= Heterographics =

Heterographics is a term for "forms of writing that draw attention to diverse scripts and alphabets."

The concept was proposed by Charles Lock and later developed by Helena Bodin, who applied it to literary texts combining scripts such as Greek, Cyrillic, Arabic, and Chinese. It has since been used in studies of multilingual and translingual literature, including work on Michael Roes and Eugene Vodolazkin. Heterographics is distinguished from multilingualism by its focus on visible scripts rather than phonetic differences.
